Li Gyong-ok (리경옥,born 15 August 1975) is a North Korean figure skater. She competed in the ladies' singles event at the 1992 Winter Olympics.

References

External links
 

1975 births
Living people
North Korean female single skaters
Olympic figure skaters of North Korea
Figure skaters at the 1992 Winter Olympics
Place of birth missing (living people)